Colonel Daniel Rudolf Anrig (born 10 July 1972) was the thirty fourth Commandant of the Pontifical Swiss Guard, appointed by Pope Benedict XVI on 19 August 2008,  He replaced Elmar Mäder who had served as Commandant of the Swiss Guard since 2002.
He was succeeded by Christoph Graf as his term  ended on 31 January 2015 and was not extended by Pope Francis.

Anrig was born in Walenstadt (Canton of St. Gallen), Switzerland. He is married and has four children. Anrig served as halberdier in the Swiss Guard between 1992 and 1994. He graduated in civil and ecclesiastical law from the University of Fribourg in 1999.

Anrig held the rank of a captain in the Swiss Army.

He was head of criminal police in the canton of Glarus, from 2002 to 2006 when he became commanding general of the police body of the canton of Glarus. Since July 2015 Anrig has also been head of a section of the Zürich Airport corps of Kantonspolizei Zürich.

In 2003, Anrig was jointly responsible for a controversial raid by the Glarus cantonal police on human and drug trafficking in a home for asylum seekers. The investigating judge dropped the investigation into disproportionate action by the police following a complaint by Amnesty International because he did not see any behavior relevant to criminal law. However, Anrig had to bear part of the legal costs.

In March 2006 he was promoted to commander of the canton police.

The period between 2012 and 2014 was increasingly overshadowed by internal quarrels. In 2012, the head of the Vatican police, Domenico Giani, and not Anrig, was honored by the international Catholic association "Tu es petrus" for his services to the security of the pope. In the tribute, Giani was referred to as the "Guardian Angel of the Pope."

On December 2, 2014, Anrig was unexpectedly dismissed, which was discussed by numerous media. He ruled with an iron fist and lived in a luxury apartment. His military style irritated Pope Francis. The pope and ex-guards denied this.

From 2015 to 2020, Anrig was head of the staff department, the smallest of the four departments, the airport police at the Zurich cantonal police. This employment was partly questioned critically.

From November 1, 2020, Anrig will be in charge of public administration in Zermatt as municipal clerk. Anrig's contract as head of public administration in Zermatt was terminated by the municipality end of  2022.

References

14. "Mysteriöses am Matterhorn: Ex-Kommandant der Schweizergarde spurlos verschwunden" 25 November 2022, retrieved 25 November 2022

Living people
1972 births
Commanders of the Swiss Guard
People from Walenstadt
Swiss military officers
Swiss police officers
Knights of the Holy Sepulchre
20th-century Swiss military personnel
21st-century Swiss military personnel